Harold Bowman ( – 4 May 1957) was an English professional rugby league footballer who played in the 1920s and 1930s.

Bowman died on 4 May 1957 aged 54, he collapsed and died at Boothferry Park while watching the Rugby League semi-final.

International honours
Harold Bowman won caps for England while at Hull in 1927 against Wales, in 1928 against Wales (2 matches), in 1929 against Other Nationalities, and won caps for Great Britain while at Hull in 1924 against New Zealand (2 matches), in 1926–27 against New Zealand (2 matches), in 1928 against Australia (2 matches), and New Zealand, and in 1929 against Australia.

References

External links
 (archived by web.archive.org) Stats → PastPlayers → B at hullfc.com
 (archived by web.archive.org) Statistics at hullfc.com

1900s births
1957 deaths
England national rugby league team players
English rugby league players
Great Britain national rugby league team players
Hull F.C. captains
Hull F.C. players
Place of birth missing
Rugby league props